The Best Of Željko Joksimović is a 2003 compilation by the pop singer and songwriter Željko Joksimović. The compilation contains his top charted songs from the previous three studio albums: Amajlija, Vreteno and  111. The compilation was released in most of the countries from the former Yugoslavia.

Track listing

 "Šta će meni više od toga"
 "7 godina"
 "Vreteno"
 "Karavan"
 "Amajlija"
 "Drska ženo plava"
 "Gadura"
 "Nema tebi doveka"
 "Varnice"
 "Petak na subotu"
 "9 dana"
 "Samo ti"
 "Tanana"
 "Ko da ne postojim"
 "Dukati"
 "Habanera"
 "Balada"
 "Zaboravljaš"

Release history

External links
 The Best Of Željko Joksimović

2004 greatest hits albums
Željko Joksimović albums